Emmanuel Church is a historic Grade II church in West Hampstead, a suburb of London, England.

Location
The church is located on the corner of Lyncroft Gardens and Fortune Green Road, just off West End Green.

History
Services started in a schoolroom at West End Green in 1846. However, the church was formally founded in 1875.

The current building was designed by architect J. A. Thomas in the Gothic Revival architectural style. Construction began on 19 June 1897 and was completed on 29 June 1903. It was built with red bricks. The south chapel inside the church has a painting by Frank O. Salisbury.

The church is still active. Services are conducted every weekday and eucharists every Sunday.

Heritage significance
The church building has been listed as Grade II by English Heritage since 11 January 1999.

Notable people
 Several noteworthy musicians have served as organist at Emmanuel Church:
 Martin Shaw (1894-1902), 
 Henry Cope Colles (1903–06)
 Harold Darke (1906-1911)
 Peter Galloway, served as Priest-in-Charge (1990–1995) and Vicar (1995–2008)

References

West Hampstead
Churches completed in 1903
Gothic Revival church buildings in England
Grade II listed churches in London
Diocese of London
Grade II listed buildings in the London Borough of Camden